Myke Bouard Ramos (born 30 October 1992) is a Brazilian footballer who plays as a forward for MTK Budapest FC.

Senior career
Starting in local club Paraná Clube, he then moved to Hungary to play for Salgótarjáni BTC where he achieved a twelve goals in thirteen competitive games for the aforementioned outfit. The following season he signed for Varda SE. He missed some matches while recovering from a crucial ankle ligament tear.

Club statistics

Updated to games played as of 15 May 2021.

References

External links
 

Brazilian footballers
Brazilian expatriate footballers
Brazilian expatriate sportspeople in Hungary
Salgótarjáni BTC footballers
Kisvárda FC players
MTK Budapest FC players
Al-Ittihad Kalba SC players
Szombathelyi Haladás footballers
Nemzeti Bajnokság I players
UAE Pro League players
Expatriate footballers in Hungary
Expatriate footballers in the United Arab Emirates
Footballers from Curitiba
Association football forwards
Living people
1992 births